Santa Fe Trail is a 1940 American Western film directed by Michael Curtiz and starring Errol Flynn as J. E. B. "Jeb" Stuart, Olivia de Havilland, Raymond Massey as John Brown, Ronald Reagan as George Armstrong Custer and Alan Hale. Written by Robert Buckner, the film is critical of the abolitionist John Brown and his controversial campaign against slavery before the American Civil War. In a subplot, Jeb Stuart and George Armstrong Custer—who are depicted as friends from the same West Point graduating class—compete for the hand of Kit Carson Holliday.

The film ranked among the higher grossing films of the year, and the seventh Flynn–de Havilland collaboration. Its content has little relevance to the actual Santa Fe Trail.

Plot
At West Point Military Academy in 1854, cadet Carl Rader (Van Heflin), an agent of John Brown, is dishonorably discharged for instigating a brawl among the cadets after distributing anti-slavery pamphlets which his classmates disapprove of—due to the controversial nature of the pamphlets (some believed the issue of slavery to be one that would inevitably resolve itself) and the U.S. Army's position against the pursuit of ideological causes while serving. Following the brawl, Rader's classmates Jeb Stuart (Errol Flynn) and George Custer (Ronald Reagan) become second lieutenants and are posted to Fort Leavenworth, Kansas Territory, the most dangerous duty in the Army—an assignment they relish. On the way to Kansas, Custer and Stuart meet Cyrus K. Holliday, in charge of building the railroad to Santa Fe, New Mexico, and his daughter Kit (Olivia de Havilland), with whom both officers fall in love.

The Kansas Territory is bloodstained and war-torn, a victim of John Brown's (Raymond Massey) relentless crusade against slavery. Meanwhile, Rader has enlisted as a mercenary in Brown's army, which has been terrorizing the countryside and freeing slaves. During Brown's attack on a freight wagon under the protection of the U.S. Army, Stuart and Custer capture Brown's injured son Jason (Gene Reynolds) and, before he dies, the troubled boy informs them about his father's hideout at Shubel Morgan's ranch in Palmyra. In disguise, Stuart rides into Palmyra, the center of the Underground Railroad, but Brown's men spot his horse's army brand. He is captured and taken to Brown at gunpoint. Attempting to escape, Stuart is trapped in a burning barn but is saved as Custer leads the cavalry to the rescue, driving Brown into seclusion.

Three years later, in 1859, believing that Brown's force has been broken, Stuart and Custer are sent back to Washington, D.C., where Stuart proposes to Kit. However, Brown is planning to re-ignite war by raiding the arsenal at Harper's Ferry, Virginia. When Brown refuses to pay Rader for his services, Rader rides to Washington to alert Stuart of Brown's plans, and the troops arrive just in time to crush the rebellion. Brown is then tried for treason by the state of Virginia and hanged. The movie ends with the marriage of Stuart and Kit.

Cast

 Errol Flynn as James Ewell Brown "Jeb" Stuart
 Olivia de Havilland as Kit Carson Holliday
 Raymond Massey as John Brown
 Ronald Reagan as George Armstrong Custer
 Alan Hale as Tex Bell
 William Lundigan as Bob Holliday
 Van Heflin as Carl Rader
 Gene Reynolds as Jason Brown
 Henry O'Neill as Cyrus K. Holliday
 Guinn "Big Boy" Williams as Windy Brody
 Alan Baxter as Oliver Brown
 Moroni Olsen as Robert E. Lee
 Ward Bond as Townley 
 Erville Alderson as Jefferson Davis
 David Bruce as Phil Sheridan
 Spencer Charters as Conductor 
 Creighton Hale as Telegraph Operator (uncredited) 
 Jack Mower as Surveyor (uncredited)

Production

Casting
The film was based on a script by Robert Buckner. At one stage, Randolph Scott was mentioned for the lead. However, by April 1940 it had become  a vehicle for Errol Flynn and Olivia de Havilland.

Raymond Massey signed to play John Brown in June.

John Wayne was mentioned as a possibility for Flynn's costar. Dennis Morgan was announced for the role of George Custer. Morgan was borrowed to appear in Kitty Foyle and replaced by Ronald Reagan before filming began. Van Heflin was signed to play the villain following his success on Broadway in The Philadelphia Story; it was his first movie since 1937.

Shooting
In June 1940, Warner Bros. announced the film as part of its slate. It was one of five films the studio announced for Flynn, the others being The Constant Nymph, Captain Horatio Hornblower, Shanghai, and Jupiter Laughs.

Filming started in July 1940, delayed by a recurrence of Flynn's malaria.

Outdoor scenes were filmed at the Lasky Movie Ranch in the Lasky Mesa area of the Simi Hills in the western San Fernando Valley, California. The railroad scenes were filmed on the Sierra Railroad in Tuolumne County, California.

Release

Premiere
The film was premiered in Santa Fe over a three-day festival, featuring a large number of celebrities, including Flynn, De Havilland, Rudy Vallée and Wayne Morris. Rita Hayworth performed a "welcome dance". There were 250 guests and two special trains, one from Hollywood and one from the East, for a total cost of $50,000 — shared between Warners and Santa Fe Railroad De Havilland was stricken with appendicitis during the trip and had to be flown home.

Vitasound
In its initial release, Warner Brothers premiered this film in some large cities with an experimental sound system named Vitasound, not stereophonic but aiming to create a greater dynamic sound range for battlefield action and dramatic music.

Box office
According to Warner Bros records, the film made a profit of $1.48 million. It made $1,748,000 domestically and $785,000 foreign.

The film was released in France in 1947 and recorded 2,147,663 admissions.

Historical inaccuracies and modern criticism

There are several major inaccuracies with many of the characters and timeline depicted in the film.  First, JEB Stuart, George Custer, and Philip Sheridan, as well as George Pickett, James Longstreet, and John Bell Hood  are all depicted as classmates in the same graduating class at West Point and all stationed in the Kansas territory at the same time. In reality they graduated at different times–Stuart in 1854, Custer in 1861, Sheridan and Hood in 1853, Pickett in 1846, and Longstreet in 1842. This depiction of these future Union and Confederate officers adds an element of foreshadowing predicting the coming Civil War conflict, in which former American officers would be forced to choose sides following Southern secession. Second, future Confederate president Jefferson Davis, who was Secretary of War under Franklin Pierce in 1854 (the time set at the beginning of the film), was not in this Cabinet position by the time of John Brown's raid of Harper's Ferry in 1859. By then, the position was being held by John B. Floyd, a member of the Buchanan administration.

This film takes substantial liberties with other historical facts:
 Stuart and Custer, while they did attend West Point—albeit at different times—and fought against one another at the Battle of Gettysburg, were never personally acquainted.
 Jason Brown did not betray his father to the US Army. He was briefly a prisoner of war, but, after John Brown sought his son's rescue, he arranged for Jason to be exchanged as a POW.
 Jason Brown was not killed in Kansas. One of Brown's other sons, Frederick, was shot by Reverend White.
 Stuart served in the 1st Cavalry Regiment, and Custer served in the 2nd and 5th Cavalry Regiments.
 Custer was never in Kansas Territory; he was stationed there after the Civil War when Kansas had already become a state.
 The character of Carl Rader, expelled from West Point and assisting (later betraying) John Brown, did not exist.
 The U.S. Cavalry did not assault the Harper's Ferry engine house that was occupied by John Brown; it was taken by U.S. Marines who incurred two casualties (one dead, one wounded).
 The railroad into New Mexico was not begun until 1879, 20 years after the fictional events in the film.
 The characters in the film carry Colt Model 1873 Single Action Army revolvers, which did not exist in 1859.
 Jefferson Davis did not have a daughter named Charlotte, who is introduced to George Custer in 1859 in the movie. His daughters were Margaret Howell Davis, who was born in 1855 and thus would have been 4 years old in 1859, and Varina Anne Davis, who was born in 1872.
Cyrus K. Holliday did not have a son named Bob or a daughter named after Kit Carson.  His children were actually named Charles King and Lillie Holliday, respectively. And the maiden name of the real Mrs. "Jeb" Stuart was Flora Cooke. 

To this day, some historians describe the figure of John Brown as a monomaniacal zealot, others as a hero for his violent tactics in the name of emancipation. The film depicts the character of John Brown generally as an antagonist, showing the valor of the principles of abolition but criticizing the methods by which Brown pursued his crusade. In the film, Brown eagerly endorses breaking apart the union of the United States and further bloodshed as a means to bringing an end to slavery, ultimately seeing his own demise as a sacrifice made to further the cause of abolition. The movie was made on the eve of the United States' entry into World War II, and its tone and political subtext express a desire to reconcile the nation's dispute over slavery which brought about the American Civil War and appeal to moviegoers in both the Southern and Northern United States. The American Civil War and abolition of slavery are presented as an oncoming tragedy triggered by the actions of an anarchic madman. The film seems to place blame for the outbreak of the Civil War on John Brown and the abolitionists perpetuating the violence of the Pottawatomie Massacre in Bleeding Kansas, but many other factors over a longer period of time.  These include the Compromise of 1850, the Fugitive Slave Act, the publication of Uncle Tom's Cabin, the Kansas-Nebraska Act, the Dred Scott Decision, non of which are addressed in the film. In many scenes, including one with a Native American fortune teller, the heroic protagonists are unable to foresee how the issue of slavery could make them bitter enemies in the near future, even though by mid- to late-1850's hostility between the pro- and anti-slavery states had already reached a boiling point.
 
To some modern viewers, the depiction of some of the black slaves seeking freedom may appear as insensitive or inaccurate in some cases. Many of the black people in the film appear to be passive or dependent on the will of John Brown as an emancipator. Slaves brought by Brown's Underground Railroad to the North seem to be following orders of the abolitionist, without any driving motive of their own to flee slavery. Slaves in Kansas wait to be told they are free by John Brown; he then specifically declares them all free in one scene. Later, several who remain behind after their "emancipation" muse about their days serving masters South in a less than negative light. Trapped in a burning shed, several John Brown's black followers are rescued by Jeb Stuart. One black woman confidently boasts to Jeb Stuart as she's bandaging his wounds. Jeb yelps: "Ouch, that's too tight, Mammy." Mammy retorts: "Don't tell me how to do this, boy! I've been wrapping white folks all my life. When they was babies, I wrapped one end, and when they growed-up and took on too much corn liquor, then I wrapped t'other end!"  Jeb laughs: "Ah, what made you leave home?"  Mammy: "Well, Old John Brown said he's gonna give us freedom, but shuckins, if this here Kansas is 'freedom', then I got no use for it. No, sir." Then, a black man adds, "Me, neither. I just wants to get back home to Texas and sit till Kingdom Come."

A 2019 review by Filmink magazine stated "This would be the least highly regarded of the 'Dodge City' trilogy. Warners had a strong track record when it came to illustrating the dangers of Nazism, but they were not crash hot on the topic of African-American history. No studio was in 1940 but Santa Fe Trail is especially dodgy."

Availability
Santa Fe Trail entered the public domain in 1968 when United Artists Television (then the owners of the pre-1950 WB library, inherited from Associated Artists Productions) did not renew the copyright. As a result, the film later became widely available on VHS, LaserDisc and DVD as well as freely available for internet downloading. 

In 1988, a colorized version was produced by Color Systems Technology for Hal Roach Studios, and released on VHS (VidAmerica, 1990). Turner Entertainment released a higher-quality VHS than was previously available (MGM/UA Home Video, 1998). Turner's library is part of the television division of Warner Bros., the original distributor. 

Although not fully restored, higher-quality editions have been released in Germany on DVD (Intergroove, 2011) and Blu-ray (WME Home Entertainment, 2017).

See also
 Errol Flynn filmography
 Olivia de Havilland filmography
 Ronald Reagan filmography
 List of films in the public domain in the United States
 List of films featuring slavery

References

Further reading
 Morsberger, Robert E. "Slavery and The Santa Fe Trail or, John Brown on Hollywood's Sour Apple Tree", American Studies (1977) 18#2 pp. 87–98. online, full-scale scholarly analysis of John Brown and other distorted historical themes

External links

 
 
 
 
 
 

1940 films
1940 Western (genre) films
American Civil War films
American Western (genre) films
American black-and-white films
Articles containing video clips
Cultural depictions of George Armstrong Custer
Cultural depictions of John Brown (abolitionist)
Cultural depictions of Robert E. Lee
1940s English-language films
Films directed by Michael Curtiz
Films produced by Hal B. Wallis
Films scored by Max Steiner
Films set in Kansas
Films set in New York (state)
Films set in Virginia
Films set in Washington, D.C.
Films set in the 1850s
Warner Bros. films
1940s American films